In mathematics, the term primitive element can mean:
 Primitive root modulo n, in number theory
 Primitive element (field theory), an element that generates a given field extension
 Primitive element (finite field), an element that generates the multiplicative group of a finite field
 Primitive element (lattice), an element in a lattice that is not a positive integer multiple of another element in the lattice
 Primitive element (coalgebra), an element X on which the comultiplication Δ has the value Δ(X) = X⊗1 + 1⊗X
 Primitive element (free group), an element of a free generating set
 Primitive element (Lie algebra), a Borel-weight vector

See also
 Primitive element theorem
 Primitive root (disambiguation)